William Fergus (26 September 1886 – 1975) was a British gymnast. He competed in the men's artistic individual all-around event at the 1908 Summer Olympics.

References

1886 births
1975 deaths
British male artistic gymnasts
Olympic gymnasts of Great Britain
Gymnasts at the 1908 Summer Olympics
Sportspeople from Dunfermline